Carlos del Pozo (6 April 1943 – 28 April 2018) was a Cuban basketball player. He competed in the men's tournament at the 1968 Summer Olympics.

References

1943 births
2018 deaths
Cuban men's basketball players
Olympic basketball players of Cuba
Basketball players at the 1968 Summer Olympics
Sportspeople from Santiago de Cuba
20th-century Cuban people